A total solar eclipse occurred on November 12, 1985. A solar eclipse occurs when the Moon passes between Earth and the Sun, thereby totally or partly obscuring the image of the Sun for a viewer on Earth. A total solar eclipse occurs when the Moon's apparent diameter is larger than the Sun's, blocking all direct sunlight, turning day into darkness. Totality occurs in a narrow path across Earth's surface, with the partial solar eclipse visible over a surrounding region thousands of kilometres wide.
It was visible only near Antarctica.

Related eclipses

Eclipses of 1985 
 A total lunar eclipse on May 4.
 A partial solar eclipse on May 19.
 A total lunar eclipse on October 28.
 A total solar eclipse on November 12.

Solar eclipses of 1982–1985

Saros 152

Metonic series

Notes

References

1985 11 12
1985 in science
1985 11 12
November 1985 events